Peter Ennals (born 23 July 1943) is  a former Australian rules footballer who played with Footscray in the Victorian Football League (VFL).

Notes

External links 
		
		
		
		
		

Living people
1943 births
Australian rules footballers from Victoria (Australia)
Western Bulldogs players
Cobram Football Club players